The Jewel Ball is a debutante Ball in Kansas City, Missouri which benefits the Nelson-Atkins Museum of Art and the Kansas City Symphony.

History
The Jewel Ball was founded in 1954 by Clara Burnham Hockaday and Enid Jackson Kemper as a fundraiser to support the Kansas City Philharmonic, now the [{Kansas City Symphony}]. The Ball has been held each year since its founding in 1954, with the exception of 2020, due to the Covid-19 pandemic. The ball is organized annually by an all-volunteer committee.

References 

Culture of Kansas City, Missouri
Balls in the United States
Debutante balls